Hashemi Rafsanjani Expressway, Also known as Niyayesh Expressway is an expressway is northern central Tehran, Iran. It starts from Vali Asr Street and becomes Abshenasan Expressway after interchange with Ashrafi Esfahani Expressway. On its way, Hashemi Rafsanjani Expressway passes Kordestan Expressway, Chamran Expressway and Yadegar-e-Emam Expressway. The eastern terminus of this expressway is connected to Sadr Expressway by a tunnel.

Expressways in Tehran